Bandu Patil (January 1, 1936 – July 23, 1988) was an Indian hockey player.
Bandu Patil represented the Indian Hockey team, which won Gold medal during 1964 Olympics.

He is from Belgaum. The Belgaum Cantonment had planned to rename the Khanapur road from Sanchayni Circle to Suryakant Park (Gogte circle) as Bandu Patil (He was a part of the gold medal-winning Indian hockey team in the 1960s) road, but it was later found that, the same road was named after Maj.Cariappa in the military records.

He played as inside left and for Services in the national championships. Patil died from cardiac arrest.

Medals
1964 Tokyo Olympics- Gold
1962 Asian Games – Silver

References

External links

1936 births
1988 deaths
People from Belgaum
Field hockey players from Karnataka
Olympic field hockey players of India
Olympic gold medalists for India
Field hockey players at the 1964 Summer Olympics
Indian male field hockey players
Olympic medalists in field hockey
Marathi sportspeople
Asian Games medalists in field hockey
Field hockey players at the 1962 Asian Games
Medalists at the 1964 Summer Olympics
Asian Games silver medalists for India
Medalists at the 1962 Asian Games